The 2014–15 Dallas Mavericks season was the 35th season of the franchise in the National Basketball Association (NBA). The Mavericks finished fourth in the Southwest Division and seventh in the Western Conference with a 50–32 record. The Mavs' season ended with a 1–4 first round playoff series loss to the Houston Rockets.

The Mavericks acquired Rajon Rondo from the Boston Celtics in a mid-season trade. However, Rondo ran into problems with head coach Rick Carlisle including engaging in a shouting match with Carlisle after being benched. Rondo left the team at the end of the season to join the Sacramento Kings.

Draft

Both second round picks the Mavericks had were traded one day prior to the draft to the New York Knicks along with José Calderón, Samuel Dalembert, Shane Larkin, and Wayne Ellington for Tyson Chandler and Raymond Felton.

Offseason

The Mavericks went into the offseason with six free agents. Being on the Mavs for his whole career, Dirk Nowitzki agreed to a new three-year contract on July 4. One day later, Devin Harris accepted a new four-year deal with the Mavs.

On July 10, the Mavs submitted a three-year, $46 million offer sheet signed by restricted free agent Chandler Parsons to the Houston Rockets. Three days later, the Rockets announced they would not match the offer, leaving Parsons to play in Dallas.

Richard Jefferson agreed to a one-year minimum contract on July 13.

On July 14, Greg Smith came to the Mavs through a trade with the Chicago Bulls for the rights to Tadija Dragićević.

Rashard Lewis agreed to a one-year minimum contract on July 16. After closing the deal on July 19, his contract was voided four days later, as it was announced that he failed the physical test and required a knee surgery.

On July 18, the Mavs signed Eric Griffin to a nonguaranteed contract.

Al-Farouq Aminu agreed to a two-year minimum contract on July 24. On the same day, Jameer Nelson agreed to a two-year contract.

On July 29, the Mavs signed Ivan Johnson to a partially guaranteed contract.

Bernard James signed a new one-year contract on September 3.

On September 8, the Mavs signed Charlie Villanueva to a nonguaranteed contract.

Doron Lamb signed a nonguaranteed contract on September 22.

Yuki Togashi was signed on October 15.

On October 21, 2014, the Mavericks waived Yuki Togashi and Eric Griffin.

The Mavericks waived Bernard James, Ivan Johnson and Doron Lamb on October 25, 2014.

On October 29, 2014, the Mavericks signed José Juan Barea and waived Gal Mekel.

Roster

Standings

Conference

Division

Game log

Preseason
The pre-season schedule was released on July 31.

|-bgcolor=ffcccc
| 1
| October 7
| Houston
| 
| Chandler Parsons (14)
| Al-Farouq Aminu (11)
| Monta Ellis (3)
| American Airlines Center17,227
| 0–1
|-bgcolor=ffcccc
| 2
| October 10
| Oklahoma City
| 
| Al-Farouq AminuJae Crowder(14)
| Tyson ChandlerChandler Parsons(6)
| Devin Harris (8)
| American Airlines Center18,397
| 0–2
|-bgcolor=ccffcc
| 3
| October 12
| Indiana
| 
| Dirk NowitzkiCharlie Villanueva(16)
| three players (7)
| Jameer Nelson (10)
| American Airlines Center17,971
| 1–2
|-bgcolor=ccffcc
| 4
| October 17
| @ Cleveland
| 
| Jameer NelsonChandler Parsons(19)
| Dirk Nowitzki (9)
| Monta Ellis (8)
| Quicken Loans Arena20,562
| 2–2
|-bgcolor=ffcccc
| 5
| October 18
| @ Indiana
| 
| Richard JeffersonGal Mekel(19)
| Al-Farouq Aminu (12)
| Gal Mekel (9)
| Bankers Life Fieldhouse15,748
| 2–3
|-bgcolor=ccffcc
| 6
| October 20
| Memphis
| 
| Tyson ChandlerMonta Ellis(14)
| Tyson Chandler (8)
| Jameer Nelson (6)
| American Airlines Center16,402
| 3–3
|-bgcolor=ffcccc
| 7
| October 23
| @ New Orleans
| 
| Gal Mekel (17)
| Bernard James (10)
| Gal Mekel (8)
| CenturyLink Center10,658
| 3–4
|-bgcolor=ccffcc
| 8
| October 24
| @ Orlando
| 
| Chandler Parsons (24)
| Tyson Chandler (5)
| Monta EllisJameer Nelson(7)
| Amway Center15,633
| 4–4
|-

Regular season
The schedule was announced on August 13.

|-bgcolor=ffcccc
| 1
| October 28
| @ San Antonio
| 
| Monta Ellis (26)
| Tyson Chandler (10)
| Monta Ellis (6)
| AT&T Center19,615
| 0–1
|-bgcolor=ccffcc
| 2
| October 30
| Utah
| 
| Dirk NowitzkiChandler Parsons(21)
| Al-Farouq Aminu (10)
| Monta Ellis (6)
| American Airlines Center19,697
| 1–1
|-

|-bgcolor=ccffcc
| 3
| November 1
| @ New Orleans
| 
| Chandler Parsons (20)
| Tyson ChandlerMonta Ellis(10)
| Devin Harris (6)
| Smoothie King Center14,547
| 2–1
|-bgcolor=ccffcc
| 4
| November 3
| Boston
| 
| Chandler Parsons (29)
| Tyson Chandler (12)
| Monta EllisDevin Harris(6)
| American Airlines Center19,948
| 3–1
|-bgcolor=ffcccc
| 5
| November 6
| @ Portland
| 
| Dirk Nowitzki (17)
| four players (4)
| Devin Harris (4)
| Moda Center19,441
| 3–2
|-bgcolor=ccffcc
| 6
| November 7
| @ Utah
| 
| Dirk Nowitzki (27)
| Tyson Chandler (13)
| Monta EllisDevin Harris(6)
| EnergySolutions Arena18,419
| 4–2
|-bgcolor=ffcccc
| 7
| November 9
| Miami
| 
| Monta Ellis (23)
| Tyson Chandler (15)
| Monta EllisJameer Nelson(5)
| American Airlines Center20,195
| 4–3
|-bgcolor=ccffcc
| 8
| November 11
| Sacramento
| 
| Dirk Nowitzki (23)
| Tyson Chandler (11)
| Devin HarrisJameer Nelson(5)
| American Airlines Center19,663
| 5–3
|-bgcolor=ccffcc
| 9
| November 13
| Philadelphia
| 
| Dirk Nowitzki (21)
| Tyson Chandler (10)
| José Juan Barea (11)
| American Airlines Center19,604
| 6–3
|-bgcolor=ccffcc
| 10
| November 15
| Minnesota
| 
| Monta Ellis (30)
| Tyson Chandler (16)
| Jameer Nelson (6)
| American Airlines Center19,730
| 7–3
|-bgcolor=ccffcc
| 11
| November 17
| @ Charlotte
| 
| Monta Ellis (18)
| Al-Farouq Aminu (11)
| Jameer Nelson (8)
| Time Warner Cable Arena15,345
| 8–3
|-bgcolor=ccffcc
| 12
| November 19
| @ Washington
| 
| Monta Ellis (34)
| Tyson Chandler (16)
| José Juan Barea (6)
| Verizon Center16,374
| 9–3
|-bgcolor=ccffcc
| 13
| November 21
| LA Lakers
| 
| Dirk Nowitzki (23)
| Al-Farouq Aminu (6)
| Monta Ellis (10)
| American Airlines Center20,353
| 10–3
|-bgcolor=ffcccc
| 14
| November 22
| @ Houston
| 
| Monta Ellis (17)
| Tyson Chandler (13)
| Jameer Nelson (6)
| Toyota Center20,353
| 10–4
|-bgcolor=ffcccc
| 15
| November 24
| Indiana
| 
| Monta Ellis (24)
| Dirk Nowitzki (11)
| Monta Ellis (6)
| American Airlines Center19,850
| 10–5
|-bgcolor=ccffcc
| 16
| November 26
| New York
| 
| Dirk Nowitzki (30)
| Tyson Chandler (25)
| Devin Harris (8)
| American Airlines Center20,352
| 11–5
|-bgcolor=ccffcc
| 17
| November 28
| @ Toronto
| 
| Monta Ellis (30)
| Tyson Chandler (10)
| José Juan Barea (9)
| Air Canada Centre19,800
| 12–5
|-bgcolor=ccffcc
| 18
| November 29
| @ Philadelphia
| 
| Tyson Chandler (20)
| Tyson Chandler (13)
| Monta Ellis (5)
| Wells Fargo Center16,145
| 13–5
|-

|-bgcolor=ccffcc
| 19
| December 2
| @ Chicago
| 
| Monta Ellis (38)
| Tyson Chandler (14)
| Dirk Nowitzki (10)
| United Center22,042
| 14–5
|-bgcolor=ccffcc
| 20
| December 3
| @ Milwaukee
| 
| Monta Ellis (23)
| Tyson Chandler (20)
| Monta Ellis (7)
| BMO Harris Bradley Center13,568
| 15–5
|-bgcolor=ffcccc
| 21
| December 5
| Phoenix
| 
| Monta Ellis (33)
| Tyson Chandler (18)
| José Juan BareaJameer Nelson(3)
| American Airlines Center20,010
| 15–6
|-bgcolor=ccffcc
| 22
| December 7
| Milwaukee
| 
| Chandler Parsons (28)
| Tyson ChandlerBrandan Wright(7)
| José Juan Barea (9)
| American Airlines Center19,413
| 16–6
|-bgcolor=ffcccc
| 23
| December 9
| @ Memphis
| 
| Chandler Parsons (30)
| Tyson Chandler (9)
| Jameer NelsonDirk Nowitzki(4)
| FedExForum19,413
| 16–7
|-bgcolor=ccffcc
| 24
| December 10
| New Orleans
| 
| Monta Ellis (26)
| Tyson ChandlerDirk Nowitzki(6)
| Monta Ellis (5)
| American Airlines Center19,988
| 17–7
|-bgcolor=ffcccc
| 25
| December 13
| Golden State
| 
| Monta Ellis (24)
| Tyson ChandlerRichard Jefferson(12)
| Monta EllisJameer Nelson(5)
| American Airlines Center20,317
| 17–8
|-bgcolor=ccffcc
| 26
| December 16
| @ New York
| 
| Dirk Nowitzki (16)
| Tyson Chandler (14)
| Monta EllisChandler Parsons(6)
| Madison Square Garden19,812
| 18–8
|-bgcolor=ccffcc
| 27
| December 17
| @ Detroit
| 
| Chandler Parsons (32)
| Dirk Nowitzki (10)
| Devin Harris (9)
| The Palace of Auburn Hills12,287
| 19–8
|-bgcolor=ccffcc
| 28
| December 20
| San Antonio
| 
| Monta Ellis (38)
| Tyson Chandler (14)
| Rajon Rondo (9)
| American Airlines Center20,504
| 20–8
|-bgcolor=ffcccc
| 29
| December 22
| Atlanta
| 
| Monta Ellis (18)
| Tyson Chandler (19)
| Rajon Rondo (11)
| American Airlines Center20,339
| 20–9
|-bgcolor=ffcccc
| 30
| December 23
| @ Phoenix
| 
| Tyson ChandlerDirk Nowitzki(22)
| Tyson Chandler (14)
| Rajon Rondo (8)
| US Airways Center18,055
| 20–10
|-bgcolor=ccffcc
| 31
| December 26
| LA Lakers
| 
| Rajon Rondo (21)
| Tyson Chandler (12)
| Monta EllisRajon Rondo(7)
| American Airlines Center20,424
| 21–10
|-bgcolor=ccffcc
| 32
| December 28
| Oklahoma City
| 
| Dirk Nowitzki (30)
| Greg Smith (8)
| Rajon Rondo (7)
| American Airlines Center20,417
| 22–10
|-bgcolor=ccffcc
| 33
| December 30
| Washington
| 
| Monta Ellis (20)
| Tyson Chandler (12)
| José Juan BareaRajon Rondo(5)
| American Airlines Center20,397
| 23–10
|-

|-bgcolor=ccffcc
| 34
| January 2
| @ Boston
| 
| Rajon Rondo (29)
| Tyson Chandler (16)
| Rajon Rondo (5)
| TD Garden18,624
| 24–10
|-bgcolor=ccffcc
| 35
| January 4
| @ Cleveland
| 
| Monta Ellis (20)
| Tyson Chandler (8)
| Rajon Rondo (8)
| Quicken Loans Arena20,562
| 25–10
|-bgcolor=ccffcc
| 36
| January 5
| @ Brooklyn
| 
| Monta Ellis (19)
| Tyson Chandler (13)
| Rajon Rondo (14)
| Barclays Center17,732
| 26–10
|-bgcolor=ffcccc
| 37
| January 7
| Detroit
| 
| Dirk Nowitzki (19)
| Tyson Chandler (15)
| Rajon Rondo (8)
| American Airlines Center20,279
| 26–11
|-bgcolor=ffcccc
| 38
| January 10
| @ LA Clippers
| 
| Dirk Nowitzki (25)
| Tyson Chandler (10)
| Rajon Rondo (8)
| Staples Center19,060
| 26–12
|-bgcolor=ccffcc
| 39
| January 13
| @ Sacramento
| 
| Monta Ellis (28)
| Tyson Chandler (17)
| Monta Ellis (10)
| Sleep Train Arena15,747
| 27–12
|-bgcolor=ffcccc
| 40
| January 14
| @ Denver
| 
| José Juan Barea (17)
| Richard Jefferson (6)
| José Juan Barea (6)
| Pepsi Center14,022
| 27–13
|-bgcolor=ccffcc
| 41
| January 16
| Denver
| 
| Dirk Nowitzki (25)
| Tyson Chandler (16)
| Rajon Rondo (8)
| American Airlines Center20,337
| 28–13
|-bgcolor=ccffcc
| 42
| January 19
| @ Memphis
| 
| Monta Ellis (25)
| Tyson Chandler (16)
| Monta Ellis (7)
| FedExForum18,119
| 29–13
|-bgcolor=ccffcc
| 43
| January 21
| @ Minnesota
| 
| Chandler Parsons (22)
| Dwight Powell (10)
| José Juan Barea (10)
| Target Center13,737
| 30–13
|-bgcolor=ffcccc
| 44
| January 23
| Chicago
| 
| Dirk Nowitzki (24)
| Tyson Chandler (12)
| Monta EllisRajon Rondo (4)
| American Airlines Center20,408
| 30–14
|-bgcolor=ffcccc
| 45
| January 25
| @ New Orleans
| 
| Monta Ellis (36)
| Rajon Rondo (8)
| Rajon Rondo (9)
| Smoothie King Center17,687
| 30–15
|-bgcolor=ffcccc
| 46
| January 27
| Memphis
| 
| Monta EllisChandler Parsons(19)
| Rajon Rondo (7)
| Rajon Rondo (5)
| American Airlines Center20,160
| 30–16
|-bgcolor=ffcccc
| 47
| January 28
| @ Houston
| 
| Monta Ellis (33)
| Tyson Chandler (15)
| Rajon Rondo (6)
| Toyota Center18,237
| 30–17
|-bgcolor=ccffcc
| 48
| January 30
| @ Miami
| 
| Charlie Villanueva (20)
| Tyson Chandler (13)
| Monta Ellis (7)
| American Airlines Arena19,823
| 31–17
|-bgcolor=ccffcc
| 49
| January 31
| @ Orlando
| 
| Monta Ellis (25)
| Tyson Chandler (9)
| Monta Ellis (13)
| Amway Center17,626
| 32–17
|-

|-bgcolor=ccffcc
| 50
| February 2
| Minnesota
| 
| Monta Ellis (23)
| Tyson Chandler (10)
| José Juan Barea (8)
| American Airlines Center19,989
| 33–17
|-bgcolor=ffcccc
| 51
| February 4
| @ Golden State
| 
| Chandler Parsons (24)
| Tyson Chandler (17)
| Devin Harris (7)
| Oracle Arena19,596
| 33–18
|-bgcolor=ccffcc
| 52
| February 5
| @ Sacramento
| 
| Monta Ellis (21)
| Tyson Chandler (16)
| Monta Ellis (6)
| Sleep Train Arena16,993
| 34–18
|-bgcolor=ccffcc
| 53
| February 7
| Portland
| 
| Dirk Nowitzki (25)
| Tyson Chandler (13)
| José Juan Barea (7)
| American Airlines Center20,398
| 35–18
|-bgcolor=ffcccc
| 54
| February 9
| LA Clippers
| 
| Charlie Villanueva (26)
| Chandler Parsons (12)
| José Juan Barea (7)
| American Airlines Center20,082
| 35–19
|-bgcolor=ccffcc
| 55
| February 11
| Utah
| 
| José Juan Barea (22)
| Dirk Nowitzki (14)
| Devin Harris (6)
| American Airlines Center19,947
| 36–19
|- align="center"
|colspan="9" bgcolor="#bbcaff"|All-Star Break
|-bgcolor=ffcccc
| 56
| February 19
| @ Oklahoma City
| 
| Dirk Nowitzki (14)
| Tyson Chandler (13)
| Rajon Rondo (6)
| Chesapeake Energy Arena18,203
| 36–20
|-bgcolor=ccffcc
| 57
| February 20
| Houston
| 
| Al-Farouq AminuDevin Harris(17)
| Tyson Chandler (14)
| Devin Harris (7)
| American Airlines Center20,389
| 37–20
|-bgcolor=ccffcc
| 58
| February 22
| Charlotte
| 
| Monta Ellis (23)
| Dirk Nowitzki (12)
| four players (4)
| American Airlines Center20,347
| 38–20
|-bgcolor=ccffcc
| 59
| February 24
| Toronto
| 
| Monta Ellis (20)
| Al-Farouq Aminu (12)
| Devin Harris (5)
| American Airlines Center20,151
| 39–20
|-bgcolor=ffcccc
| 60
| February 25
| @ Atlanta
| 
| Monta Ellis (19)
| Bernard James (11)
| José Juan Barea (7)
| Philips Arena16,126
| 39–21
|-bgcolor=ffcccc
| 61
| February 28
| Brooklyn
| 
| Dirk Nowitzki (20)
| Rajon Rondo (7)
| Rajon Rondo (6)
| American Airlines Center20,367
| 39–22
|-

|-bgcolor=ccffcc
| 62
| March 2
| New Orleans
| 
| Monta Ellis (20)
| Dirk Nowitzki (8)
| four players (2)
| American Airlines Center20,367
| 40–22
|-bgcolor=ffcccc
| 63
| March 5
| @ Portland
| 
| Monta EllisAmar'e Stoudemire(12)
| Tyson Chandler (14)
| Rajon Rondo (9)
| Moda Center19,499
| 40–23
|-bgcolor=ffcccc
| 64
| March 6
| @ Golden State
| 
| Dirk NowitzkiRajon Rondo(14)
| three players (5)
| Rajon Rondo (6)
| Oracle Arena19,596
| 40–24
|-bgcolor=ccffcc
| 65
| March 8
| @ LA Lakers
| 
| Monta Ellis (31)
| Tyson ChandlerChandler Parsons(6)
| Rajon Rondo (9)
| Staples Center18,997
| 41–24
|-bgcolor=ffcccc
| 66
| March 10
| Cleveland
| 
| Chandler Parsons (18)
| Tyson Chandler (10)
| José Juan Barea (5)
| American Airlines Center20,501
| 41–25
|-bgcolor=ccffcc
| 67
| March 13
| LA Clippers
| 
| Chandler Parsons (22)
| Tyson Chandler (12)
| Rajon Rondo (7)
| American Airlines Center20,444
| 42–25
|-bgcolor=ccffcc
| 68
| March 16
| Oklahoma City
| 
| Chandler Parsons (31)
| Tyson Chandler (7)
| Rajon Rondo (13)
| American Airlines Center20,231
| 43–25
|-bgcolor=ccffcc
| 69
| March 18
| Orlando
| 
| Dirk Nowitzki (25)
| three players (8)
| Rajon Rondo (11)
| American Airlines Center20,294
| 44–25
|-bgcolor=ffcccc
| 70
| March 20
| Memphis
| 
| Devin HarrisDirk Nowitzki(16)
| Tyson Chandler (13)
| Rajon Rondo (4)
| American Airlines Center20,399
| 44–26
|-bgcolor=ffcccc
| 71
| March 22
| @ Phoenix
| 
| Chandler Parsons (19)
| Tyson Chandler (11)
| Rajon Rondo (6)
| US Airways Center17,435
| 44–27
|-bgcolor=ccffcc
| 72
| March 24
| San Antonio
| 
| Monta Ellis (38)
| Dirk Nowitzki (13)
| Monta EllisRajon Rondo(5)
| American Airlines Center20,328
| 45–27
|-bgcolor=ffcccc
| 73
| March 27
| @ San Antonio
| 
| Tyson ChandlerMonta Ellis(10)
| Tyson Chandler (14)
| Rajon Rondo (5)
| AT&T Center18,581
| 45–28
|-bgcolor=ffcccc
| 74
| March 29
| @ Indiana
| 
| Chandler Parsons (27)
| Tyson Chandler (11)
| Rajon Rondo (10) 
| Bankers Life Fieldhouse17,358
| 45–29
|-

|-bgcolor=ccffcc
| 75
| April 1
| @ Oklahoma City
| 
| Monta Ellis (26)
| Tyson Chandler (10)
| Rajon Rondo (10) 
| Chesapeake Energy Arena18,203
| 46–29
|-bgcolor=ffcccc
| 76
| April 2
| Houston
| 
| Dirk Nowitzki (21)
| Tyson Chandler (8)
| Rajon Rondo (6)
| American Airlines Center20,062
| 46–30
|-bgcolor=ffcccc
| 77
| April 4
| Golden State
| 
| Dirk Nowitzki (18)
| Tyson Chandler (13)
| Rajon Rondo (5)
| American Airlines Center20,407
| 46–31
|-bgcolor=ccffcc
| 78
| April 8
| Phoenix
| 
| Monta Ellis (20)
| Tyson Chandler (23)
| Rajon Rondo (7)
| American Airlines Center20,262
| 47–31
|-bgcolor=ccffcc
| 79
| April 10
| @ Denver
| 
| Dirk Nowitzki (25)
| Tyson Chandler (11)
| José Juan BareaDevin Harris(9)
| Pepsi Center14,041
| 48–31
|-bgcolor=ccffcc
| 80
| April 12
| @ LA Lakers
| 
| Tyson Chandler (20)
| Al-Farouq Aminu (10)
| Rajon Rondo (11)
| Staples Center18,071
| 49–31
|-bgcolor=ffcccc
| 81
| April 13
| @ Utah
| 
| José Juan Barea (18)
| Al-Farouq Aminu (10)
| Raymond FeltonRajon Rondo(5)
| EnergySolutions Arena19,911
| 49–32
|-bgcolor=ccffcc
| 82
| April 15
| Portland
| 
| Tyson Chandler (22)
| Tyson Chandler (15)
| Rajon Rondo (7)
| American Airlines Center20,352
| 50–32

Playoffs

|-bgcolor=ffbbbb
| 1
| April 18
| @ Houston
| 
| Dirk Nowitzki (24)
| Tyson Chandler (18)
| Rajon Rondo (5)
| Toyota Center18,231
| 0–1
|-bgcolor=ffbbbb
| 2
| April 21
| @ Houston
| 
| Monta Ellis (24)
| Dirk Nowitzki (13)
| Ellis, Felton (3)
| Toyota Center18,243
| 0–2
|-bgcolor=ffbbbb
| 3
| April 24
| Houston
| 
| Ellis, Nowitzki (34)
| Chandler, Nowitzki (8)
| Ellis, Barea (9)
| American Airlines Center20,651
| 0–3
|-bgcolor=bbffbb
| 4
| April 26
| Houston
| 
| Monta Ellis (31)
| Tyson Chandler (14)
| J. J. Barea (10)
| American Airlines Center20,589
| 1–3
|-bgcolor=ffbbbb
| 5
| April 28
| @ Houston
| 
| Monta Ellis (25)
| Dirk Nowitzki (14)
| J. J. Barea (9)
| Toyota Center18,231
| 1–4

Player statistics
Final statistics.

Regular season

|-
| 
| 74 || 3 || 18.5 || .412 || .274 || .712 || 4.6 || .8 || .9 || .8 || 5.6
|-
| 
| 77 || 10 || 17.7 || .420 || .323 || .809 || 1.7 || 3.4 || .4 || .0 || 7.5
|-
| 
| 75 || 75 || 30.5 || .666 || .000 || .720 || style=background:#0B60AD;color:white;|11.5 || 1.1 || .6 || 1.2 || 10.3
|-
| ‡
| 25 || 0 || 10.6 || .434 || .342 || style=background:#0B60AD;color:white;|.909 || 1.2 || .5 || .6 || .2 || 3.6
|-
| 
| style=background:#0B60AD;color:white;|80 || style=background:#0B60AD;color:white;|80 || style=background:#0B60AD;color:white;|33.7 || .445 || .285 || .752 || 2.4 || 4.1 || style=background:#0B60AD;color:white;|1.9 || .3 || style=background:#0B60AD;color:white;|18.9
|-
| 
| 29 || 3 || 9.7 || .406 || .294 || .800 || .9 || 1.4 || .4 || .1 || 3.7
|-
| 
| 76 || 3 || 22.2 || .418 || .357 || .815 || 1.8 || 3.1 || 1.0 || .2 || 8.8
|-
| 
| 16 || 2 || 9.9 || .444 || .000 || .870 || 2.4 || .3 || .1 || .9 || 2.8
|-
| 
| 74 || 18 || 16.8 || .444 || style=background:#0B60AD;color:white;|.426 || .684 || 2.5 || .8 || .4 || .1 || 5.8
|-
| ‡‡
| 5 || 0 || 2.2 || .000 || .000 || .500 || .4 || .2 || .0 || .0 || .2
|-
| ‡
| 23 || 23 || 25.4 || .374 || .369 || .875 || 2.7 || 4.1 || .7 || .1 || 7.3
|-
| 
| 77 || 77 || 29.6 || .459 || .380 || .882 || 5.9 || 1.9 || .5 || .4 || 17.3
|-
| 
| 66 || 66 || 33.1 || .462 || .380 || .720 || 4.9 || 2.4 || 1.0 || .3 || 15.7
|-
| 
| 24 || 0 || 9.5 || .435 || .273 || .774 || 2.0 || .4 || .3 || .3 || 3.4
|-
| 
| 46 || 46 || 28.7 || .436 || .352 || .452 || 4.5 || style=background:#0B60AD;color:white;|6.5 || 1.2 || .1 || 9.3
|-
| 
| 42 || 2 || 8.6 || .612 || .000 || .513 || 1.9 || .2 || .2 || .3 || 1.9
|-
| 
| 23 || 1 || 16.5 || .581 || .000 || .678 || 3.7 || .3 || .4 || .2 || 10.8
|-
| 
| 64 || 1 || 10.6 || .414 || .376 || .571 || 2.3 || .3 || .2 || .3 || 6.3
|-
| ‡
| 27 || 0 || 18.7 || style=background:#0B60AD;color:white;|.748 || .000 || .750 || 4.1 || .4 || .6 || style=background:#0B60AD;color:white;|1.6 || 8.8
|}
‡Traded mid-season

‡‡Waived during season

Playoffs

|-
| 
| 5 || 2 || 30.0 || .548 || style=background:#0B60AD;color:white;|.636 || .789 || 7.2 || 1.2 || 2.0 || style=background:#0B60AD;color:white;|1.6 || 11.2
|-
| 
| 5 || 2 || 30.8 || .439 || .250 || .833 || 4.8 || style=background:#0B60AD;color:white;|7.4 || .8 || .0 || 11.8
|-
| 
| 5 || 5 || 32.0 || style=background:#0B60AD;color:white;|.655 || .000 || .500 || style=background:#0B60AD;color:white;|10.8 || .2 || .6 || 1.2 || 10.2
|-
| 
| 5 || 5 || style=background:#0B60AD;color:white;|39.4 || .468 || .367 || .750 || 3.4 || 5.2 || 2.0 || .6 || style=background:#0B60AD;color:white;|26.0
|-
| 
| 3 || 1 || 12.0 || .267 || .000 || 1.000 || 2.3 || 1.3 || .0 || .0 || 3.7
|-
| 
| 4 || 0 || 18.5 || .348 || .000 || .889 || 2.0 || 1.0 || .5 || .0 || 6.0
|-
| 
| 1 || 0 || 2.0 || .000 || .000 || .000 || .0 || .0 || .0 || .0 || .0
|-
| 
| 4 || 2 || 12.8 || .357 || .375 || 1.000 || .5 || .3 || .5 || .0 || 3.8
|-
| 
| 5 || 5 || 36.2 || .452 || .235 || .929 || 10.2 || 2.4 || .4 || .4 || 21.2
|-
| 
| 1 || 1 || 37.0 || .333 || .000 || .000 || 6.0 || 2.0 || .0 || .0 || 10.0
|-
| 
| 2 || 0 || 1.5 || .000 || .000 || .000 || .5 || .5 || .0 || .0 || .0
|-
| 
| 2 || 2 || 18.5 || .450 || .500 || .000 || 1.0 || 3.0 || .0 || .0 || 9.5
|-
| 
| 1 || 0 || 1.0 || .000 || .000 || .000 || .0 || .0 || .0 || .0 || .0
|-
| 
| 5 || 0 || 15.0 || .429 || .000 || .692 || 3.2 || .6 || .2 || .6 || 7.8
|-
| 
| 5 || 0 || 8.6 || .440 || .421 || .000 || 2.6 || .6 || .2 || .2 || 6.0
|}

Injuries

Milestones
 Dirk Nowitzki passed Hakeem Olajuwon on November 11, 2014, heading into ninth place on the all-time scoring list.
 Nowitzki scored his 27,000th point for one franchise on November 17, 2014.
 Nowitzki passed Elvin Hayes on December 26, 2014, heading into eighth place on the all-time scoring list.
 Nowitzki passed Moses Malone on January 5, 2015, heading into seventh place on the all-time scoring list.
 Nowitzki recorded his 10,000th career rebound on March 24, 2015.
 Nowitzki scored his 28,000th career point on April 1, 2015.

Awards

Transactions

Overview

Trades

Free agents

Additions

Subtractions

References

External links
 2014–15 Dallas Mavericks season at ESPN

Dallas Mavericks seasons
Dallas Mavericks
Dallas
Dallas
2010s in Dallas
2014 in Texas
2015 in Texas